North–South line may refer to any of several different railway and metro lines:

 North-South Line (KTM Intercity), the West Coast Line in Malaysia
 North–South MRT line of the Mass Rapid Transit in Singapore
 North–South Line (Jakarta MRT) of the Jakarta MRT in Jakarta, Indonesia
 North/South line (Amsterdam metro) of the Amsterdam Metro in the Netherlands
 North–South railway in Germany
 NS Line, a north–south streetcar line in Portland, Oregon, U.S.
 Red Line (MARTA) (formerly North–South line) in Georgia, U.S.
 South Line, Tasmania the main north–south line in Tasmania
 North–South Rail Link, a proposed link between Boston's South Station and North Station
 SAR North–South Railway line, in Saudi Arabia

Japanese
 may refer to any of several Japanese railway lines:
 Namboku Line (Osaka) (Kita–Osaka Kyuko Railway)
 Namboku Line (Kobe) (Kobe Rapid Railway)
 Namboku Line (Sapporo) (Sapporo Municipal Subway)
 Sendai Subway Namboku Line in Sendai
 Tokyo Metro Namboku Line in Tokyo

See also 
 North-South Corridor (disambiguation)
 North–South Railway (disambiguation)
 East West Line (disambiguation)
 Central line (disambiguation)